Fairy circles are circular patches of land barren of plants, varying between  in diameter, often encircled by a ring of stimulated growth of grass. Until 2014, the phenomenon was only known to occur in the arid grasslands of the Namib desert in western parts of Southern Africa, being particularly common in Namibia. In that year, ecologists were alerted to similar rings of vegetation outside Africa, in a part of the Pilbara in Western Australia.

Fairy circles typically occur in essentially monospecific grassy vegetation, where conditions are particularly arid. Associated grasses commonly are species in the genus Stipagrostis. Studies show that these circles pass through a life cycle of some 30 to 60 years.

Like the heuweltjies and Mima mounds, the cause of fairy circles has long been a puzzle and the investigation has proved challenging. One favoured theory is that the distinct vegetation patterns are a population-level consequence of competition for scarce water, as the plants "organise" themselves to maximise access to scarce resources. The circular barren patches capture water which then flows to the outer edges of the ring. More water available increases biomass and roots which leads to the soil becoming looser. The less dense soil allows more water to penetrate and feed the vegetation, creating a feedback loop supporting the plants at the edge of the circle.

Location 

It is largely a remote and inhospitable region, much of it over a hundred kilometres from the nearest village. The circles have been recognised and informally remarked on for many years, first being mentioned in technical literature in the 1920s and intermittently thereafter with the intensity of study increasing during the final quarter of the 20th century.

In 2014, fairy circles were first discovered outside Africa, 15 kilometres outside of the town Newman in the Pilbara of Western Australia. Australian environmental engineer Bronwyn Bell, alongside Dr Stephan Getzin from the Helmholtz Centre for Environmental Research, released a paper in 2016, providing new insight into possible cause of the fairy circle formations.

Theories of formation 

There has long been debate about the causes of the circles. The investigation and development of theories have included numerous theories both mundane and supernatural. One favoured assumption is that the sand termite Psammotermes allocerus is responsible, but the range of the phenomena is much wider than that of the termite species, and details of the effects vary, so to ascribe all circles to any such single cause would be unrealistic.

In 2004, University of Pretoria's Botany professor Gretel van Rooyen rejected proposals of termite activity, radioactive soil, and of plant toxins. In 2008, Angelique Joubert proposed that residual plant toxins remaining in the soil after the death of Euphorbia damarana plants might be the cause of the barren interiors of the circles.

In 2012, Eugene Moll suggested the termite species Baucaliotermes hainsei and Psammotermes allocerus as the creator of these circles. All rings have been found to contain termite casts, and radar investigations suggest that a moist layer of soil is situated beneath the fairy circles.

In 2013, this theory was supported by Norbert Juergens. Juergens found evidence that the sand termite, Psammotermes allocerus, generates a local ecosystem that profits from and promotes the creation of the fairy circle. The sand termite was found in 80-100% of the circles, in 100% of newly formed circles, and was the only insect to live across the range of the phenomenon.  Sand termites create the fairy circle by consuming vegetation and burrowing in the soil to create the ring. The barren circle allows water to percolate down through sandy soil and accumulate underground, allowing the soil to remain moist even under the driest conditions. Grass growth around the circle is promoted by the accumulated soil water, and in turn the termites feed on the grasses, slowly increasing the diameter of the circle. This behavior on the part of Psammotermes allocerus amounts to creation of a local ecosystem in a manner analogous to behaviour of the common beaver.

Juergens' research aroused interest in the media, but has been criticised. Walter R. Tschinkel, a biologist at Florida State University who also researched the fairy circles, remarked that Juergens, "has made the common scientific error of confusing correlation (even very strong correlation) with causation." Previously, Tschinkel had searched for harvester termites without success. Juergens responded that sand termites differ from harvester termites and live deep beneath the circle; they do not create mounds or nests above ground, and they leave no tracks in the sand. In such respects the sand termite is unusually inconspicuous in its activities.

Unresolved questions remain about the soil from the center of the circle inhibiting plant growth and the interactions of other species in the fairy circle as they relate to the local ecosystem. Furthermore, the received wisdom from about a century ago remarked on the "heuweltjies" being anomalously rich in plant nutrients, raising the question of how many effectively different types or circumstances of circles or heuweltjies there might be.

Later in 2013, Michael Cramer and Nichole Barger suggested that the circles were the consequence of vegetation patterns that arose naturally from competition between grasses.  They examined the conditions under which fairy circles arise and found that fairy circles are negatively correlated with precipitation and soil nutrition. This observation is consistent with resource competition being a cause of the crop circles. Grassy landscapes with a mixture of grasses can result in barren spots as a consequence of under-ground competition between different types of grasses. The patches are maintained because they form a reservoir of nutrients for the taller grasses at the periphery and possibly because of the activity of termites, as in the theory above.  Using rainfall, biomass and temperature seasonality, they can predict with high accuracy the presence or absence of fairy circles in a region. According to Walter Tschinkel, this theory accounts for all the characteristics of fairy circles, including the presence of tall grass species. Other recent work has considered interacting combinations of both animal- and vegetation-induced patterning effects as a potential unifying theoretical explanation for the fairy circle phenomenon.

In 2021 an explanation using hydrological feedbacks and the Turing mechanism has been proposed as the cause of the patterns In 2023, weak seeps of hydrogen through faults, fractures, and diffused through rocks, were identified as a possible cause of the depressions.

Myths 
In the oral myths of the Himba people, these barren patches are said to have been caused by the gods, spirits and/or natural divinities. The region's bushmen have traditionally ascribed spiritual and magical powers to them. Of specific beliefs, the Himba people note that their original ancestor, Mukuru was responsible for the creation of the fairy circles, or that they were the footprints of gods.

Another myth put forth, promoted by some tour guides, is that the circles are formed by a dragon in the earth and that its poisonous breath kills the vegetation.

Use 
The Himba people use the fairy circles in their agriculture. Because fairy circles support grasses in otherwise barren land, they provide grazing. Sometimes they erect temporary wooden fences around the circles to corral young cattle for overnight protection against predators.

See also

 Heuweltjie
 Hodotermitidae
 Mima mounds
 Creosote bush rings
 Fairy ring
 Forest ring
 Tiger bush
 List of unsolved problems in biology
 Patterns in nature

References

Further reading
 Fairy circles - Namibia, South Africa
 'Fairy circles' of Africa baffle scientists
 Scientist uses satellites to examine circles in African desert
 PLoS ONE: The Life Cycle and Life Span of Namibian Fairy Circles

External links
 

Environment of Namibia
Kunene Region
Landforms
Unexplained phenomena